Roy F. Kramer (born October 30, 1929) is a former American high school, college football coach and athletics administrator.  Kramer was the head football coach for Central Michigan University from 1967 to 1977, compiling a record of 83–32–2 and winning the 1974 NCAA Division II Football Championship.  He then served as the athletic director at Vanderbilt University from 1978 to 1990, and later as the commissioner of the Southeastern Conference from 1990 to 2002, where he created the Bowl Championship Series.

Administrative career
Kramer became the sixth commissioner of the Southeastern Conference on January 10, 1990.  Within seven months of his appointment, the conference announced plans for expansion, adding Arkansas and South Carolina officially on July 1, 1991.  Following expansion, Kramer guided the conference in formulating divisional play and the first Division I-A conference football championship game.

During his tenure at the helm of the SEC, the conference won 81 national championships, the most ever in a decade by the league. Kramer oversaw the distribution of a then-league record $95.7 million to its member institutions for 2001–02. Kramer negotiated multi-sport national television packages with CBS and ESPN, featuring football and men's and women's basketball, through the 2008–09 season.

Because of his influence, the Men's and Women's SEC Athlete of the year award is presented annually as the Roy F. Kramer Award.

Kramer was succeeded as the SEC's commissioner by Michael Slive.

Awards and honors
 1964 Michigan Class A "Coach of the Year" at East Lansing High
 1974 Division II national "Coach of the Year"
 1987 Central Michigan Athletics Hall of Fame inductee
 1989 Tennessee Sports Hall of Fame inductee
 1998 Distinguished American Award by the National Football Foundation
 2003 Alabama Sports Hall of Fame inductee
 2008 Awarded the Distinguished Eagle Scout Award 
 2008 Vanderbilt Athletics Hall of Fame inductee as part of its inaugural class  
 2011 NCFAA Contribution to College Football Award
 2013 East Lansing HS Athletics Hall of Fame inductee
 2013 Awarded the Duffy Daugherty Award

Head coaching record

College

References

External links
Tough as Nails: 2013 class of The Champions: Pioneers & Innovators in Sports Business
East Tennessean of the Year
The Complete Book of the I-Formation

Living people
Coaches of American football from Tennessee
Central Michigan Chippewas football coaches
Southeastern Conference commissioners
Vanderbilt Commodores athletic directors
High school football coaches in Michigan
People from Maryville, Tennessee
Maryville College alumni
University of Michigan alumni
1929 births